Adam Parfitt (born 22 April 1974) is a Canadian rower. He competed in the men's eight event at the 1996 Summer Olympics.

References

External links
 

1974 births
Living people
Canadian male rowers
Olympic rowers of Canada
Rowers at the 1996 Summer Olympics
Rowers at the 2000 Summer Olympics
Rowers from Victoria, British Columbia
Pan American Games medalists in rowing
Pan American Games silver medalists for Canada
Rowers at the 1995 Pan American Games